Peter Coyne (born 28 October 1964) is an Australian former rugby league footballer who played in the 1980s and 1990s.

Playing career
Coyne started his career at the Brisbane Valleys club and later at the English Halifax, before joining his brother Mark Coyne at St. George Dragons in 1991.

Coyne was a five-eighth, and played in the 1992 Grand Final for St. George Dragons. After two great years at the Dragons, he returned to England to play for Castleford (Heritage № 701).

References

1964 births
Living people
Australian rugby league players
Australian expatriate sportspeople in England
Castleford Tigers players
Halifax R.L.F.C. players
Rugby league five-eighths
Rugby league players from Brisbane
St. George Dragons players